Ian Black (born 4 February 1960) is a Scottish former professional footballer who played as a full back in the Scottish Football League for Hearts, Hibernian, East Fife and Berwick Rangers.

Personal life
Black's son, also named Ian, also played for Hearts.

References

External links
 

1960 births
Living people
Scottish footballers
Heart of Midlothian F.C. players
Hibernian F.C. players
East Fife F.C. players
Berwick Rangers F.C. players
Scottish Football League players
Association football fullbacks
Footballers from Edinburgh